The  is a Japanese term for the regional government in Kyushu from the 8th to the 12th centuries. The name may also refer to the seat of government which grew into the modern city of Dazaifu in Fukuoka Prefecture.

History
The Dazaifu was established in northwest Kyushu the late 7th century. The town of Dazaifu grew up around the civil and military headquarters of the regional government.

During the 8th and 9th centuries, records refer to Dazaifu as "the distant capital".

In 1268, envoys bearing letters from Kublai Khan appeared at the Dazaifu court.  There were a series of envoys which came before the unsuccessful invasion of 1274.

In the Muromachi period the political center of the region was moved to Hakata.

The city of Dazaifu was the center of the Shōni clan and later the Ōuchi clan. In the Edo period, Dazaifu was a part of Kuroda domain until the han system was abolished in 1873.

Usage
The flexible term refers to the regional government for all of Kyūshū and nearby islands.

From the 7th through the 13th century, the governor and vice-governor of Dazaifu had civil and military functions. The titles of the vice governors were Dazai dani and Dazai shoni.  Among the Dazai shoni was Fujiwara no Hirotsugu in 740 who started a rebellion in the same year.

Sometimes there was an official Absentee Governor (Dazai-no-sotsu).  This title was only given to Imperial princes.  Among those holding this office was Takaharu-shinnō who would later become Emperor Go-Daigo.

City
Dazaifu is the name of the place where regional government was centered in the late Nara period through the Muromachi period.  It is the town which grew up around the government center in the 7th through the 12th centuries.  It is also the name of the small city which continued to grow even after the regional government center was moved.

Region
Dazaifu refers to the region which includes all the provinces on the island of Kyūshū and other nearby islands.

Government
The Dazaifu is the name of the civil government on the island of Kyūshū.

Dazaifu is a metonym of the official position at the head of the regional government.  It is also a metonym for the person who fills this leadership role.

See also
 Asteroid 19917 Dazaifu named for the Dazaifu government
 Sugawara no Michizane

Notes

References
 Adolphson, Mikael S. et al. (2007). Heian Japan, Centers and Peripheries. Honolulu : University of Hawaii Press. ;  OCLC 260109801
 Ponsonby-Fane, Richard. (1959).  The Imperial House of Japan. Kyoto: Ponsonby Memorial Society. OCLC 194887
 Sansom, George Bailey. (1958). A History of Japan to 1334. Stanford: Stanford University Press. OCLC 256194432
 Titsingh, Isaac. (1834).  Annales des empereurs du Japon (Nihon Odai Ichiran).  Paris: Royal Asiatic Society, Oriental Translation Fund of Great Britain and Ireland. OCLC 5850691

External links
 Dazaifu City of Ancient Culture

Government of feudal Japan
Special Historic Sites